Ramon Wilson, MBE (17 December 1934 – 15 May 2018) was an English professional footballer who played at left back. He was a member of the England national team that won the 1966 World Cup. He was born in Shirebrook, Derbyshire.

Club career

Huddersfield Town
Wilson became an apprentice railwayman upon leaving school, but was spotted by a scout playing amateur football at Huddersfield Town. He began a combination of working on the tracks by night and training with Huddersfield by day, before being called up for national service.

Quickly singled out as a strong and nippy left back, with good overlapping skills, by the then-Huddersfield Town manager Bill Shankly, Wilson signed professional forms with the club in 1952 after his two-year army posting, and made his debut against Manchester United in October 1955. Two years later, Wilson was Huddersfield's established, first-choice left back. As well as the full England side, he was selected for various representative teams such the Football League and an 'FA XI'.

Everton
In 1964, Wilson joined Everton, by which time he had already played 30 times for England, and he remains Huddersfield's most-capped England international. However, a torn thigh muscle sustained in training meant that he missed most of his first season at Everton. He went on to win the FA Cup with Everton in 1966. Two years later, he was on the losing side, as Everton were beaten by West Bromwich Albion in the 1968 FA Cup Final. Wilson's fortunes declined at Everton following another injury, and he was granted a free transfer in 1969, missing out on Everton's First Division title in 1970.

Later career
Wilson moved to Oldham Athletic on a free in 1969. In 1970 he moved again to Bradford City. He served as caretaker manager at Bradford from September to November 1971 after the departure of Jimmy Wheeler. He took command for ten games before being succeeded by Bryan Edwards.

International career
In April 1960, Wilson won his first cap for England in a 1–1 draw with Scotland. Over the next 12 months, he became a fixture in the side. The FA selection committee put him in the squad for the 1962 World Cup in Chile, and Wilson played in all three group games and England's elimination in the quarter finals at the hands of Brazil.

After the World Cup, Wilson kept his England place under new manager Alf Ramsey. With Ramsey successfully snatching sole responsibility for picking the team from the FA came a firm feeling that Wilson was Ramsey's highest-rated left-back. Others, such as Liverpool's Gerry Byrne, were given the odd chance, but Wilson remained Ramsey's first choice.

As hosts of the 1966 World Cup, England did not have to partake in a rigorous qualifying campaign, and Ramsey experimented with other left-backs as he shaped a squad for the tournament. Later the same year, Wilson was playing at Wembley on six more occasions, ever-present as Ramsey's England got through a World Cup group consisting of Uruguay, Mexico and France; a highly volatile quarter-final against a violent Argentina, and a semi-final against the skilful but enigmatic Portuguese, which was Wilson's 50th appearance for his country.

Wilson was the oldest member of the England team in the World Cup final against West Germany. His early headed clearance fell to striker Helmut Haller, who gave the Germans the lead as a result, but after a hat-trick from Geoff Hurst, England ran out 4–2 winners.

Ramsey continued to select Wilson as England progressed through the qualification process for the 1968 European Championships, ultimately going out in the semi-finals and finishing third overall. Wilson's 63rd and final England cap came in the third-place play-off against the USSR. At the time of his final cap, he held the record for the highest number of appearances for an outfield player without having scored a goal, a record since broken by Gary Neville and Ashley Cole.

A serious knee injury suffered in the summer of 1968, coupled with the emergence of young Leeds United full-back Terry Cooper (who would be as impressive in the 1970 World Cup as Wilson was in 1966, despite England's elimination in the last eight), ended Wilson's England career.

After retirement from football
Wilson after his playing days ended built an undertaker's business in Huddersfield. Wilson retired as an undertaker in 1997 to Halifax. In 2000, he and four of his 1966 teammates – Hunt, George Cohen, Nobby Stiles and Alan Ball – were appointed MBE for services to football after a high-profile campaign conducted by sections of the media, which was surprised that their contribution to England's World Cup win had never been recognised by the British honours system. The other six, plus Ramsey, had already received various honours. In 2008, Wilson was inducted into the English Football Hall of Fame by a select committee of ex-footballers.

He lived in Slaithwaite near Huddersfield with his wife Pat, who was three years his junior. They had two children. Ray and Pat Wilson were interviewed together in the book No More Worlds to Conquer by Chris Wright (2015).

Wilson was diagnosed with Alzheimer's disease in 2004, along with World Cup-winning teammates Martin Peters in 2013 and Nobby Stiles in 2012. It is feared that the disease was brought on by their heading of the heavier footballs used in their playing days.

On 30 July 2016, fifty years to the day since England lifted the World Cup, Wilson's former club Huddersfield Town released its new second-change kit for the 2016–17 season in his honour. It was released with the tag line "Legends Are Rarely Made", and featured a red shirt, in homage to the 1966 World Cup winning kit, and had Wilson's signature in white, just beneath the collar on the back, and below the white badge on the front. Ray's two sons and his wife released a statement alongside the release:

On 15 May 2018, Wilson died in a care home in Huddersfield from Alzheimer's disease after suffering from the condition for 14 years.

Honours
Everton
FA Cup: 1966

England
World Cup: 1966

References

External links

 My Yorkshire – Ray Wilson talks about the 1966 victory
 BBC radio interview with Ray Wilson, 1999
 

1934 births
2018 deaths
People from Shirebrook
Footballers from Derbyshire
English footballers
Association football fullbacks
Everton F.C. players
Huddersfield Town A.F.C. players
Oldham Athletic A.F.C. players
Bradford City A.F.C. players
English Football League players
FA Cup Final players
England international footballers
1962 FIFA World Cup players
1966 FIFA World Cup players
UEFA Euro 1968 players
FIFA World Cup-winning players
English Football League representative players
English football managers
Bradford City A.F.C. managers
English Football League managers
English Football Hall of Fame inductees
Members of the Order of the British Empire
British funeral directors
Deaths from dementia in England
Deaths from Alzheimer's disease
Sportspeople with chronic traumatic encephalopathy